Charles Ernest Lakin  (1878–1972) was an English physician, surgeon, pathologist, and anatomist.

Biography
After education at Carter’s School and the Wyggeston Grammar School for Boys, Leicester, Charles Ernest Lakin entered in 1896 the Middlesex Hospital Medical School. He qualified in 1901 MRCS, LRCP. He graduated in 1902 MB BS (Lond.) and in 1903 MD. For some years Lakin was a demonstrator of anatomy and a clinical assistant in the skin department at the Middlesex Hospital and also a clinical assistant at the Hospital for Sick Children, Great Ormond Street. He was also curator of the Middlesex Hospital's pathological museum and wrote its history in 1908. In 1908 he qualified MRCP. From 1904 to 1912 he performed all the autopsies at the Middlesex Hospital. There in 1912 he was appointed assistant physician and lecturer in morbid anatomy. He later also joined the London Fever Hospital's staff and became advisory physician to London's Royal National Throat, Nose and Ear Hospital. During WWI he served in the RAMC as pathologist at the Addington Park War Hospital, although he continued his civilian appointment as consultant physician at the Middlesex Hospital. During WWII Lakin moved to Mount Vernon Hospital, Northwood, London, and continued there at least until 1950.

Awards and honours
 1905 — elected FRCS
 1916 — elected FRCP
 1932 — Lumleian Lecturer on The Borderlands of Medicine
 1934 — Lettsomian Lecturer on Disturbances of the Body Temperature
 1938 — President of the Medical Society of London with Presidential Address on Lettsom's England
 1943 — Annual Orator to the Medical Society of London with Annual Oration on Outside the Textbooks
 1947 — Harveian Orator on Our Founders and Benefactors

Selected publications

References

1878 births
1972 deaths
19th-century English medical doctors
20th-century English medical doctors
People educated at Wyggeston Grammar School for Boys
Physicians of the Middlesex Hospital
Fellows of the Royal College of Physicians
Fellows of the Royal College of Surgeons
Royal Army Medical Corps officers